Ahmed Tevfik Pasha (‎; 11 February 1845 – 8 October 1936), later Ahmet Tevfik Okday after the Turkish Surname Law of 1934, was an Ottoman statesman of Crimean Tatar origin. He was the last Grand vizier of the Ottoman Empire. He held the office three times, the first in 1909 under Sultan Abdul Hamid II, and from 1918 to 1919 and from 1920 to 1922 under Mehmed VI during the Allied occupation of Istanbul. In addition to his premiership, Ahmet Tevfik was also a diplomat, a member of the Ottoman Senate, and the Minister of Foreign Affairs.

Early life
Ahmet Tevfik was born on 11 February 1845 in Constantinople. His father, Ferik Ismail Pasha, was a Crimean Tatar descended from the Giray dynasty. Ahmet Tevfik entered military service but left after becoming a junior officer, entering government bureaucracy training. After 1872, he held various foreign ministry posts. After serving as an ambassador in Rome, Vienna, St. Petersburg, and Athens, he served as the Ottoman chargé d'affaires and ambassador to Germany in Berlin from 1885 to 1895. After returning to Istanbul, he served as the Minister of Foreign Affairs from 1899 to 1909. After the proclamation of the Second Constitutional Era in 1908, Ahmet Tevfik Pasha was appointed to a seat in the revived Senate of the Ottoman Empire, the upper house of the also-revived parliament, the General Assembly (Turkish: Meclis-i Mebusan).

While serving as chargé d'affaires in Athens, he met and married Elisabeth Tschumi, a Swiss woman working as a governess to the children of another diplomat. They had five children together.

Grand Vizier of the Ottoman Empire

First term (1909–1910)

Ahmet Tevfik Pasha's first period of office as grand vizier was one of the direct outcomes of the failed counterrevolutionary 31 March Incident (which actually occurred on 13 April) in 1909. When the absolutists declared the countercoup, they demanded and received the resignation of the previous Grand Vizier Hüseyin Hilmi Pasha. Although their preferred replacement was not Ahmet Tevfik Pasha, his appointment at least fulfilled their demands for the removal of Hüseyin Hilmi Pasha. Ahmet Tevfik Pasha, who had only reluctantly taken up the post at the urging of the pro-absolutist Sultan Abdul Hamid II, formed a government made up of mostly non-partisan and neutral members and took precautions to limit the growth of violence that had begun in Istanbul and Adana. After the Hareket Ordusu (English: Army of Action) entered Istanbul and restored the constitutional government, and Abdul Hamid was deposed, Ahmet Tevfik Pasha resigned and Hüseyin Hilmi Pasha returned as grand vizier.

Second term (1918–1919)
After World War I and the resignation of Ahmed Izzet Pasha, Ahmet Tevfik Pasha was again appointed grand vizier on 11 November 1918. Two days after his term began, the Allies began their occupation of Constantinople. The Allies pressured Sultan Mehmed VI to dissolve the parliament on 21 December 1918, and for a few weeks, Ahmet Tevfik Pasha's government was dissolved as well. He formed his government again on 12 January 1919, but after the invaders forced him to dissolve it once more, he resigned as grand vizier on 3 March 1919. A political scandal that contributed to the fall of the government was the escape of Mehmed Reshid from prison and his subsequent suicide, who was high ranking CUP member who was known as the "butcher of Diyarbakır" during World War I. Damat Ferid Pasha accused Tevfik of being soft on the Unionists, which prompted Tevfik Pasha to arrest key committeemen after the event. Ferid Pasha succeeded Tevfik on the 4 March 1919.

Paris Peace Conference

After his second term as grand vizier, Ahmet Tevfik Pasha became the head of the Senate of the Ottoman Empire (which had not yet been dissolved, unlike the lower house). He then served as the president of the Ottoman delegation to the Paris Peace Conference ending World War I. Ahmet Tevfik Pasha's delegation refused the heavy terms of the proposed treaty, but another delegation sent by the Grand Vizier Damat Ferid Pasha accepted the terms and signed the Treaty of Sèvres.

Third term (1920–1922)
On 21 October 1920, he was once more appointed grand vizier, replacing Damat Ferit Pasha. Meanwhile, the Turkish National Movement had established another government in Ankara, proclaiming itself to be the sole government of the nation and rejecting the sultanate. Ahmet Tevfik Pasha offered the nationalist Ankara government to join his monarchical Istanbul government to form one body at the Conference of London in 1921. However, the leader in Ankara, Mustafa Kemal, refused the offer, and the two governments sent separate delegations to the conference, with Ahmet Tevfik Pasha himself leading the Istanbul delegation and Bekir Sami Kunduh leading the Ankara delegation. However, once he arrived in London, Ahmet Tevfik Pasha, in a surprising move, proclaimed that the Ankara government indeed was the sole rightful government of Turkey and allowed Bekir Sami to be the only representative at the conference.

After the abolition of the Ottoman Sultanate on 1 November 1922, Ahmet Tevfik Pasha met with his government. With the Sultan Mehmed VI gone and unable to find a reason to hold their offices any longer, the government began to resign one by one, and Ahmet Tevfik Pasha resigned three days after the abolition on 4 November 1922.

Later life and death

After the 1934 Surname Law, he adopted the last name "Okday". He died on 8 October 1936 in Istanbul and is interred at the Edirnekapı Martyr's Cemetery.

His biography, written by his grandson Şefik Meetu Okday, was published in 1986 and is titled My Grandfather, the Last Grand Vizier, Ahmet Tevfik Pasha (Turkish: Büyükbabam Son Sadrazam Ahmet Tevfik Paşa).

See also
 List of Ottoman Grand Viziers
 Ministry of Foreign Affairs (Ottoman Empire)

References

External links

 

Honorary Knights Grand Commander of the Order of the Star of India
Grand Crosses of the Order of Vasa
1845 births
1936 deaths
Burials at Edirnekapı Martyr's Cemetery
20th-century Grand Viziers of the Ottoman Empire
Ambassadors of the Ottoman Empire to Germany
Ambassadors of the Ottoman Empire to Greece
Ambassadors of the Ottoman Empire to the United Kingdom
Ambassadors of the Ottoman Empire to the Russian Empire
Ambassadors of the Ottoman Empire to Austria-Hungary
Ambassadors of the Ottoman Empire
Turkish people of Crimean Tatar descent
Politicians from Istanbul
Ministers of Foreign Affairs of the Ottoman Empire
Turkish novelists
Members of the Senate of the Ottoman Empire
Diplomats from Istanbul